The FIA Prize Giving Ceremony is an annual event promoted by Fédération Internationale de l'Automobile (FIA) which honours the achievements of all FIA Champions over the past season.

In 2014, FIA inaugurated a new format where FIA Champions and guests take part in a competition held at a karting track designed by Hermann Tilke, under the direction of the F1 race director. The day culminates with a glamorous two-part ceremony celebrating the FIA champions. The winners of the Personality of the Year and Action of the Year awards will be unveiled that same evening, as will brand new Rookie of the Year award and Pole Position trophy.

Location

Awards winners

Personality of the Year 

The FIA Personality of the Year award sees permanently accredited media from the FIA's World Championships honour the competitor or figure who they believe achieved an exceptional performance this season. This figure can be a driver, a team manager, an official, a volunteer, etc., affiliated to an FIA Championship or Event. Each member of the media is required to vote for three individuals in the first stage before choosing from a final selection of ten. The Personality of the Year award was dropped ahead of the 2022 Prize Giving Ceremony, replaced with two new prize categories.

Action of the Year

The FIA Action of the Year award allows motorsport fans to choose their defining event of the sporting year. Balloting for the award is undertaken by motor racing fans via the FIA's official website.

Rookie of the Year 

The FIA Rookie of the Year is selected amongst drivers who completed their first season in an FIA-sanctioned championship. Eligible series include the FIA Formula One World Championship, World Rally Championship, European Rally Championship, World Touring Car Championship, FIA World Endurance Championship, World Rallycross Championship, European Rallycross Championship, FIA Formula 2 Championship, FIA Formula Three Championships, and CIK Karting KF World Championship.

References

Fédération Internationale de l'Automobile
Auto racing trophies and awards